The World Factbook, also known as the CIA World Factbook, is a reference resource produced by the Central Intelligence Agency (CIA) with almanac-style information about the countries of the world. The official print version is available from the Government Publishing Office. The Factbook is available in the form of a website that is partially updated every week. It is also available for download for use off-line. It provides a two- to three-page summary of the demographics, geography, communications, government, economy, and military of 266 international entities including U.S.-recognized countries, dependencies, and other areas in the world.

The World Factbook is prepared by the CIA for the use of U.S. government officials, and its style, format, coverage, and content are primarily designed to meet their requirements. However, it is frequently used as a resource for academic research papers and news articles. As a work of the U.S. government, it is in the public domain in the United States.

Sources 

In researching the Factbook, the CIA uses the sources listed below. Other public and private sources are also consulted.

 Antarctic Information Program (National Science Foundation)
 Armed Forces Medical Intelligence Center (Department of Defense)
 Bureau of the Census (Department of Commerce)
 Bureau of Labor Statistics (Department of Labor)
 Council of Managers of National Antarctic Programs
 Defense Intelligence Agency (Department of Defense)
 Department of Energy
 Department of State
 Fish and Wildlife Service (Department of the Interior)
 Maritime Administration (Department of Transportation)
 National Geospatial-Intelligence Agency (Department of Defense)
 Naval Facilities Engineering Command (Department of Defense)
 Office of Insular Affairs (Department of the Interior)
 Office of Naval Intelligence (Department of Defense)
 Oil & Gas Journal
 United States Board on Geographic Names (Department of the Interior)
 United States Transportation Command (Department of Defense)

Copyright 

The Factbook is in the public domain and may be redistributed in part or in whole without need for permission, although the CIA requests that the Factbook be cited if used. Copying the official seal of the CIA without permission is prohibited by the US federal Central Intelligence Agency Act of 1949.

Frequency of updates and availability 
Before November 2001, The World Factbook website was updated yearly; from 2004 to 2010 it was updated every two weeks; since 2010 it has been updated weekly. Generally, information currently available as of January 1 of the current year is used in preparing the Factbook.

Government edition 
The first classified edition of Factbook was published in August 1962, and the first unclassified version in June 1971. The World Factbook was first available to the public in print in 1975. Until 2008 the CIA printed the Factbook; from then it hase been printed by the Government Printing Office following a CIA decision to "focus Factbook resources" on the online edition. The Factbook has been available via the World Wide Web since October 1994, receiving about six million visits per month in 2006; it can also be downloaded. The official printed version is sold by the Government Printing Office and National Technical Information Service. In past years, the Factbook was available on CD-ROM, microfiche, magnetic tape, and floppy disk.

Reprints and older editions online 
Many Internet sites use information and images from the CIA World Factbook. Several publishers, including Grand River Books, Potomac Books (formerly known as Brassey's Inc.), and Skyhorse Publishing have published the Factbook in recent years. Older editions since 2000 may be downloaded (but not browsed) from the Factbook Web site.

Entities listed 

, The World Factbook comprises 266 entities, which can be divided into the following categories:

 Independent countries The CIA defines these as people "politically organized into a sovereign state with a definite territory." In this category, there are 195 entities.
 Others Places set apart from the list of independent countries. Currently there are two: Taiwan and the European Union.
 Dependencies and Areas of Special Sovereignty Places affiliated with another country. They may be subcategorized by affiliated country:
Australia: 6 entities
China: 2 entities
Denmark: 2 entities
France: 8 entities
Netherlands: 3 entities
New Zealand: 3 entities
Norway: 3 entities
United Kingdom: 17 entities
United States: 14 entities
 Miscellaneous Antarctica and places in dispute. There are six such entities.
 Other entities The World and the oceans. There are five oceans and the World (the World entry is intended as a summary of the other entries).

Territorial issues and controversies

Political

Areas not covered 
Specific regions within a country or areas in dispute among countries, such as Kashmir, are not covered, but other areas of the world whose status is disputed, such as the Spratly Islands, have entries. Subnational areas of countries (such as U.S. states or the Canadian provinces and territories) are not included in the Factbook. Instead, users looking for information about subnational areas are referred to "a comprehensive encyclopedia" for their reference needs. This criterion was invoked in the 2007 and 2011 editions with the decision to drop the entries for French Guiana, Guadeloupe, Martinique, Mayotte, and Reunion. They were dropped because besides being overseas departments, they were now overseas regions, and an integral part of France. Since the Trump administration's recognition of Morocco's sovereignty over Western Sahara in late 2020, most of its data has been merged into Morocco's page.

Chagos Archipelago 
Some entries on the World Factbook are known to be in line with the political views and agenda of the United States. The United States is behind both the excision of the Chagos Archipelago from Mauritian territory and the forcible expulsion of the Chagossians from their lands to establish a military base on one of the island of the archipelago, namely Diego Garcia. The US does not recognise the sovereignty of Mauritius over the Chagos Archipelago and the archipelago is listed as the British Indian Ocean Territory on the CIA Website. The website further erroneously mentioned that the Chagos Archipelago is also claimed by the Seychelles, while officially 116 countries including the Seychelles against only 6 countries including the United States voted in favor of a United Nations General Assembly resolution dated 24 May 2019 which called upon the United Kingdom to withdraw its colonial administration from the Chagos Archipelago unconditionally to enable Mauritius to complete the decolonization of its territory as rapidly as possible.

Kashmir 
Maps depicting Kashmir have the Indo-Pakistani border drawn at the Line of Control, but the region of Kashmir administered by China drawn in hash marks.

Northern Cyprus 
Northern Cyprus, which the U.S. considers part of the Republic of Cyprus, is not given a separate entry because "territorial occupations/annexations not recognized by the United States Government are not shown on U.S. Government maps."

Taiwan/Republic of China 
The name "Republic of China" is not listed as Taiwan's official name under the "Government" section, due to U.S. acknowledgement of Beijing's One-China policy according to which there is one China and Taiwan is a part of it. The name "Republic of China" was briefly added on January 27, 2005, but has since been changed back to "none". Of the Factbooks two maps of China, one highlights the island of Taiwan as part of the country while the other does not. (See also: Political status of Taiwan, Legal status of Taiwan)

Disputed South China Sea Islands 
The Paracel Islands and Spratly Islands, subjects of territorial disputes, have entries in the Factbook where they are not listed as the territory of any one nation. The disputed claims to the islands are discussed in the entries.

Burma/Myanmar 
The U.S. does not recognize the renaming of Burma by its ruling military junta to Myanmar and thus keeps its entry for the country under the Burma name.

North Macedonia 
The country was first entered as Macedonia in the Factbook upon independence in 1992. In the 1994 edition, the name of the entry was changed to the Former Yugoslav Republic of Macedonia, as it is recognised by the United Nations (pending resolution of the Macedonia naming dispute). For the next decade, this was the name the nation was listed under. In the 2004 edition of the Factbook, the name of the entry was changed back to Macedonia, following a November 2004 U.S. decision to refer to the country using this name. On February 19, 2019, the entry was renamed to North Macedonia following the country's name change to the Republic of North Macedonia.

European Union 
On December 16, 2004, the CIA added an entry for the European Union (EU) for the first time. The "What's New" section of the 2005 Factbook states: "The European Union continues to accrue more nation-like characteristics for itself and so a separate listing was deemed appropriate."

United States Pacific Island Wildlife Refuges and Iles Eparses 
In the 2006 edition of The World Factbook, the entries for Baker Island, Howland Island, Jarvis Island, Kingman Reef, Johnston Atoll, Palmyra Atoll and the Midway Islands were merged into a new United States Pacific Island Wildlife Refuges entry. The old entries for each individual insular area remain as redirects on the Factbook website. On September 7, 2006, the CIA also merged the entries for Bassas da India, Europa Island, the Glorioso Islands, Juan de Nova Island, and Tromelin Island into a new Iles Eparses entry. As with the new United States Pacific Island Wildlife Refuges entry, the old entries for these five islands remained as redirects on the website. On July 19, 2007, the Iles Eparses entry and redirects for each island were dropped due to the group becoming a district of the French Southern and Antarctic Lands in February.

Serbia and Montenegro/Yugoslavia 
The Socialist Federal Republic of Yugoslavia (SFRY) broke apart in 1991. The following year, it was replaced in the Factbook with entries for each of its former constituent republics. In doing this, the CIA listed the Federal Republic of Yugoslavia (FRY), proclaimed in 1992, as Serbia and Montenegro, as the U.S. did not recognize the union between the two republics. This was done in accordance with a May 21, 1992, decision by the U.S. not to recognize any of the former Yugoslav republics as successor states to the recently dissolved SFRY.

These views were made clear in a disclaimer printed in the Factbook: "Serbia and Montenegro have asserted the formation of a joint independent state, but this entity has not been recognized as a state by the United States." Montenegro and Serbia were treated separately in the Factbook data, as can be seen on the map. In October 2000, Slobodan Milošević was forced out of office after a disputed election. This event led to democratic elections and U.S. diplomatic recognition. The 2001 edition of the Factbook thus referred to the state as Yugoslavia. On March 14, 2002, an agreement was signed to transform the FRY into a loose state union called Serbia and Montenegro; it took effect on February 4, 2003. The name of the Yugoslavia entity was altered in the Factbook the month after the change.

Kosovo 
On February 28, 2008, the CIA added an entry for Kosovo, which declared independence on February 17 of the same year. Before this, Kosovo was excluded in the Factbook. Kosovo is the subject of a territorial dispute; Serbia continues to claim Kosovo as part of its own sovereign territory. Kosovo's independence has been  out of  United Nations member states, including the United States.

East Timor/Timor-Leste 
On July 19, 2007, the entry for East Timor was renamed Timor-Leste following a decision of the United States Board on Geographic Names (BGN).

Factual 
In June 2009, National Public Radio (NPR), relying on information obtained from The World Factbook, put the number of Israeli Jews living in settlements in the West Bank and Israeli-annexed East Jerusalem at 250,000. However, a better estimate, based on State Department and Israeli sources put the figure at about 500,000. NPR then issued a correction. Chuck Holmes, foreign editor for NPR Digital, said, "I'm surprised and displeased, and it makes me wonder what other information is out-of-date or incorrect in the CIA World Factbook."

The factbook currently states that only four percent of Batswana are practitioners of the indigenous Badimo religion, in reality a great majority of Batswana follow at least some of the traditions deemed Badimo. 

Scholars have acknowledged that some entries in the Factbook are out of date.

See also 

 World Leaders, another regular publication of the CIA
 National Security Agency academic publications

 Alternative publications
 Europa World Year Book
 The New York Times Almanac
 Time Almanac with Information Please
 Whitaker's Almanack
 World Almanac

References

Citations

General and cited sources

External links 

 
 CIA World Factbook as XML
 On stephansmap.org – The CIA World Factbook accessible by location and date range; covers the years 2001–2007. All Factbook entries are tagged with "cia". Requires graphical browser with javascript.
 The current CIA World Factbook in Excel spreadsheet format

Mobile versions of the Factbook 
 Mobile menu of 36 years of CIA World Factbooks, last updated February 2019
 World Factbook for Android – Optimized CIA World Factbook version for Android Devices

The Factbook by year 
 Countries of the World – 36 years of the CIA World Factbook: (1982–2019)
 Previous editions of The World Factbook from the University of Missouri–St. Louis archive:
1992, 1993, 1994, 1995, 1996, 1997, 1998, 1999, 2000, 2001, 2002, 2003, 2004, 2005, 2006, 2007, 2008
 1991 CIA World Factbook
 1990 CIA World Factbook
 1989 CIA World Factbook
 1987 CIA World Factbook
 1986 CIA World Factbook
 1985 CIA World Factbook
 1984 CIA World Factbook
 1982 CIA World Factbook

 
1962 establishments in the United States
Academic works about intelligence analysis
Almanacs
Factbook
Publications established in 1962
Reference works in the public domain